{{Automatic_taxobox
| image = Cylindroiulus boleti.png
| image_caption = Cylindroiulus boleti
| taxon = Cylindroiulus
| authority = Verhoeff, 1894
| type_species = 
| type_species_authority = 
}}Cylindroiulus is a genus of millipedes of the Julidae family.

Species
Listed alphabetically.Cylindroiulus abaligetanusCylindroiulus aetnensisCylindroiulus anglilectusCylindroiulus aostanusCylindroiulus apenninorumCylindroiulus arborumCylindroiulus aternanusCylindroiulus attenuatusCylindroiulus bellusCylindroiulus boletiCylindroiulus boreoibericusCylindroiulus brachyiuloidesCylindroiulus britannicusCylindroiulus brotiCylindroiulus burzenlandicusCylindroiulus caeruleocinctus Cylindroiulus cambioCylindroiulus cantoniiCylindroiulus caramujensisCylindroiulus chalandeiCylindroiulus cristagalliCylindroiulus dahliCylindroiulus decipiensCylindroiulus digitusCylindroiulus disjunctusCylindroiulus dubiusCylindroiulus exiguusCylindroiulus fenestratusCylindroiulus festaiCylindroiulus fimbriatusCylindroiulus finitimusCylindroiulus franziCylindroiulus fulvicepsCylindroiulus gemellusCylindroiulus generosensisCylindroiulus gestriCylindroiulus gigasCylindroiulus gregoryiCylindroiulus hirticaudaCylindroiulus horvathiCylindroiulus ibericusCylindroiulus iluronensisCylindroiulus infernalisCylindroiulus insolidusCylindroiulus italicusCylindroiulus julipesCylindroiulus kappaCylindroiulus lagrecaiCylindroiulus latestriatusCylindroiulus latroCylindroiulus latzeliCylindroiulus laurisilvaeCylindroiulus limitaneusCylindroiulus londinensisCylindroiulus lundbladiCylindroiulus luridusCylindroiulus madeiraeCylindroiulus meinertiCylindroiulus molisiusCylindroiulus numerosusCylindroiulus obscuriorCylindroiulus pallidiorCylindroiulus parisiorumCylindroiulus pelatensisCylindroiulus perforatusCylindroiulus propinquusCylindroiulus punctatus (Leach, 1815) – blunt-tailed snake millipedeCylindroiulus pyrenaicusCylindroiulus quadratistipesCylindroiulus rabacalensisCylindroiulus rubidicollisCylindroiulus rufifronsCylindroiulus sagittariusCylindroiulus salicivorusCylindroiulus sanctimichaelisCylindroiulus sangranusCylindroiulus sardousCylindroiulus schubartiCylindroiulus segregatusCylindroiulus siculusCylindroiulus solariusCylindroiulus solisCylindroiulus sorrentinusCylindroiulus speluncarisCylindroiulus strasseriCylindroiulus transmarinusCylindroiulus tricuspisCylindroiulus truncorumCylindroiulus turinensisCylindroiulus uncinatusCylindroiulus uroxiphosCylindroiulus velatusCylindroiulus ventaneanaCylindroiulus verhoeffiCylindroiulus vulnerariusCylindroiulus waldeniCylindroiulus xynonCylindroiulus ynnoxCylindroiulus zarcoi''

References

Julida